Abu Ayman is the name of:

 Abu Ayman al-Iraqi, top ISIL commander (1965–2014)
 Abu Ayman al-Masri, Egyptian leader of al-Qaeda in the Arabian Peninsula
 Sheikh Abu Ayman, Jordanian-Australian Salafi leader